The Demonstration Multipurpose School (DMS) of Bhubaneswar, Odisha, India, can trace its roots back to 1964, and is one of the oldest schools in Bhubaneswar. It is a co-educational school, administered by the NCERT. It serves about 1500 pupils, it is a constituents body of RIE ( Regional Institute of Education). There are only four such schools in India located at Bhopal, Ajmer, Mysuru and Bhubaneswar.

Demonstration Multipurpose School pilots experiments such as the introduction of the Central Board of Secondary Education.

It is the only school in Bhubaneswar to offer SUPW studies as a course including Electrical, Home Science, Metal Works, Wood Carpentry, Typewriting, Computer Education, and  Agriculture ;  it is one of the few in India to provide a multipurpose education.

Sports and games
The school's annual sports meet date from the early 1960s.
Sporting activities include:
 Cricket
 Basketball
 Football
 Volleyball
 Throwball
 Badminton
 Kho Kho

The school has produced one international cricketer Shiv Sunder Das who represented India in 23 Test matches and scored 1,326 runs at an average of 38.91, hitting two centuries, both of them against Zimbabwe.

European partnerships
The school cultivates international relationships through annual student exchange program with Nadderud Videregaende Skole, Oslo, Norway under UNESCO / ASP Friendship Exchange Programme. Every year a team consisting of faculty members and students from these institutions visit each other to promote mutual understanding between youth from Norway and India.

Publications
The school magazine is Udayashree. Udayashree enables students to air their views and showcase their literary  talents. It features input from all sections of the school community, including from teachers. The school also publishes a quarterly news report.  As the school's  publication of record, it contains session dates, a staff list and a list of awards.

Notable alumni

Notable alumni include: 
 Shaktikanta Das – Governor of Reserve Bank of India and former IAS officer.
 Suparno Satpathy – Socio-political-leader.
 Shiv Sunder Das – Indian cricketer represented India in 23 Test matches.
 B. K. Misra – Neurosurgeon, recipient of Dr. B. C. Roy Award, the highest medical honour in India.
 Archita Sahu – Ponds Femina Miss India, winner of two awards.

Gallery

See also
Regional Institute of Education, Bhubaneswar

References

Schools in Bhubaneswar
Educational institutions established in 1964
1964 establishments in Orissa